Malcolm H. McMullen (August 23, 1927 – April 13, 1995) was an American professional basketball player. He played for two seasons in the National Basketball Association for the Indianapolis Olympians and averaged 4.8 points per game for his career.

McMullen was also a golf professional in his post-basketball life and won several tournaments including the Indiana Open in 1974. He was the professional at Kokomo Country Club in Kokomo, Indiana from 1960 to 1992. He was inducted into the Indiana Golf Hall of Fame in 1981.

Golf tournament wins
1974 Indiana Open
1979 Indiana PGA Senior Championship
1980 Indiana PGA Championship, Indiana PGA Senior Championship
1984 Indiana PGA Senior Open
1991 Indiana PGA Senior Championship

References

1927 births
1995 deaths
American male golfers
American men's basketball players
Baltimore Bullets (1944–1954) draft picks
Basketball players from Ohio
Centers (basketball)
Forwards (basketball)
Golfers from Indiana
Golfers from Ohio
Indianapolis Olympians players
Kentucky Wildcats men's basketball players
Kentucky Wildcats men's golfers
Xavier Musketeers men's basketball players
Xavier Musketeers men's golfers